The Le Moyne Dolphins are the athletic teams that represent Le Moyne College, located in DeWitt, New York, in NCAA Division II intercollegiate sporting competitions. The Dolphins compete as members of Northeast-10 Conference. Le Moyne has been a member of the NE-10 since 1996.

More than 75 percent of students are estimated to participate in some form of athletics at Le Moyne. Le Moyne student-athletes have combined to post term cumulative grade-point averages of at least 3.0 in 39 consecutive semesters dating back to 2003 (through Fall 2022). Dolphin student-athletes routinely combine for term GPAs of at least 3.3 in addition to completing more than 2,500 hours of community service each year as part of The Le Moyne Way program.

The Le Moyne Men's basketball team gained national attention when it defeated Division I powerhouse Syracuse 82–79 in a November 2009 exhibition game. Le Moyne's women's basketball team nearly pulled a similar shocker before falling to Syracuse 73-70 in an exhibition game at the JMA Wireless Dome on November 3, 2022.

Le Moyne has long been a lacrosse power at the Division II level, earning seven men's and women's National Championships in the sport. The Dolphins' men's lacrosse team captured its sixth National crown in 2021 under the leadership of head coach Dan Sheehan. Le Moyne registered its lone women's lacrosse National title in 2018.

Following a long career in senior administration at the West Point, Bob Beretta was named Director of Athletics on Jan. 7, 2021. He is only the fourth Director of Athletics in the college's history.

Varsity teams

List of teams

Men's basketball

In 1960, the men's basketball team won the Middle Eastern College Athletic Association Tournament, which was hosted by Saint Peter's College at the Jersey City Armory. In the tournament, Le Moyne defeated Saint Peter's, Iona and LIU to win.

Athletic facilities 
The Thomas J. Niland Athletic Complex houses Le Moyne College's athletic teams, visiting competitors, and coaches. Student-athletes use outdoor facilities including the Dick Rockwell Field for baseball, tennis courts, a softball complex and other fields including Ted Grant Field, completed in 2010, an athletic turf complex for lacrosse and soccer. The Niland Complex includes the Henninger Athletic Center, where basketball games and other events take place on Ted Grant Court.  Niland served as the College's basketball coach from its inception in 1947 until 1973, winning 327 games and going to seven NCAA tournaments.  Niland continued at Le Moyne as athletic director until his retirement in 1990.

The Complex also includes the Dick Rockwell Baseball Field.  Rockwell, a graduate of Ithaca College, won 757 games on the Heights between 1968 and 1996 at the Division I and II levels, going to the Division II national tournament 12 of their last 13 seasons in the division, and becoming a power in the Metro Atlantic Athletic Conference in Division I.  Rockwell also served as Le Moyne athletic director from 1990 to 2009.

The Campus also has trails behind the school that are used by the Cross Country for their home meets and other teams to train on.

National championships

Team

Individual

Club sports, intramural sports and facilities 
The Thomas J. Niland Athletic Complex incorporates a  facility with a  competition-size swimming pool, fitness center and weight room, a three-court size multi-purpose gym area, an elevated jogging track, and four racquetball courts. It is designed primarily for intramural, recreational use, and personal fitness activities. Students can also use fitness centers which are located in several of the residence halls.

The College participates in thirteen sports on the club level: men's ice hockey, men's lacrosse, women's lacrosse, women's field hockey, women's basketball, men's rugby, women's rugby, equestrian, fencing, rowing, ultimate frisbee, sailing, and Tae Kwon Do, in addition to cheerleading, with both men and women on the squad. All club teams are given qualified coaches, practice facilities and uniforms.

The College conducts an extensive intramural program with sports and competitors that vary each year. The program usually includes: basketball (men's and women's leagues); flag football (men); indoor soccer (men's, women's and coed leagues); walleyball (coed); racquetball tournaments (coed, men's and women's divisions); volleyball (coed); softball (men's and women's leagues); and inner tube water polo (coed).

Notable alumni
C. J. Asuncion-Byrd (2016–2019)
Isaiah Eisendorf (2016–2018)

References

External links